Augères is a commune in the Creuse department in the Nouvelle-Aquitaine region in central France.

Geography

Population

Sights
 The church of St.Pierre, dating from the fifteenth century.
 The chapel de Villars, from the fourteenth century.

See also
Communes of the Creuse department

References

Communes of Creuse